Archana Suseelan (born 6 October 1988) is an Indian actress who predominantly works in the Malayalam television industry.

Personal life and career
Archana is a half Nepali and Indian born to Malayali father and Nepali mother.

Archana came into limelight and became popular for her role as Gloria in the television series Ente Manasaputhri which aired on Asianet channel. She was also seen in several television serials in both Tamil and Malayalam languages. She is settled at Thiruvananthapuram with her family. She also runs a restaurant.

Television

Television soap opera's

TV shows

Filmography

Awards and nominations

Albums
2001 Nilamazhayayi
2002 Malaikah
2005 Ennum Ninakkayi 
2010 Orunaal
2018 Karivalayum Kanmashiyum
2022 Keralam Gathi Mattum

References

External links

 

Living people
Actresses from Pune
21st-century Indian actresses
Actresses in Malayalam television
Indian television actresses
Actresses in Tamil television
Actresses in Hindi cinema
Actresses in Tamil cinema
Actresses in Malayalam cinema
Bigg Boss Malayalam contestants
1992 births